Monosyntaxis bipunctata is a moth of the family Erebidae. It was described by George Thomas Bethune-Baker in 1904. It is found in New Guinea, where it is found in mountainous areas, particularly the Central Mountains. It is also found in Papua New Guinea.

The species is very similar to Monosyntaxis fojaensis. Females are easily distinguished by the different coloured hindwings, but males can be distinguished only by the difference in the antennae.

References

Lithosiina
Moths described in 1904